Petko Petkov (born May 17, 1958) is a Bulgarian former volleyball player who competed in the 1980 Summer Olympics and 1988 Summer Olympics.

He was born in Dimitrovgrad.

In 1980 he won the silver medal with Bulgarian team in the Olympic tournament. He played all six matches.

Eight years later he was part of the Bulgarian team which finished sixth in the Olympic tournament. He played six matches.

External links
Sports-reference.com profile

1958 births
Living people
Bulgarian men's volleyball players
Olympic volleyball players of Bulgaria
Volleyball players at the 1980 Summer Olympics
Volleyball players at the 1988 Summer Olympics
Olympic silver medalists for Bulgaria
Olympic medalists in volleyball
Medalists at the 1980 Summer Olympics
People from Dimitrovgrad, Bulgaria
Sportspeople from Haskovo Province